Chris White (born April 26, 1980) is a professional box lacrosse player in the National Lacrosse League with the Toronto Rock.

Professional career
White was originally drafted in the second round, 20th overall by the Albany Attack in the 2001 NLL Entry Draft.

White played one season with the Attack, then transferred with the franchise when it relocated to San Jose, California and became the San Jose Stealth in 2004.

He was acquired by the Bandits in a trade on December 4, 2004. He was traded to the Bandits by the Stealth in exchange for a first-round pick, 11th overall (which was originally the Toronto Rock's pick) in the 2005 NLL Entry Draft.

As of the conclusion of the 2008 season, White is ninth all-time on the Bandits penalty list. To start the 2009 season, he was named captain of the Bandits in place of injured Rich Kilgour. White served as captain for four games. During the 2009 NLL season, he was named a starter to the All-Star Game.

After two more years in Buffalo, serving as the team captain after the retirement of Rich Kilgour, White became an unrestricted free agent and signed a one-year deal with the Toronto Rock.

Statistics

NLL
Reference:

References

1980 births
Living people
Buffalo Bandits players
Canadian lacrosse players
National Lacrosse League All-Stars
San Jose Stealth players
Sportspeople from Peterborough, Ontario
Toronto Rock players